The Model 42 was an entry-level four seat passenger car produced by GM's Oldsmobile Division in 1914, offered as a replacement to the Oldsmobile Curved Dash runabout when it was discontinued in 1908, and was the junior platform to the Oldsmobile Six introduced in 1913. GM had acquired Elmore Manufacturing Company, Oldsmobile and Oakland Motor Car Company in 1908 and Cartercar and Rainier Motor Car Company in 1909 as their entry-level models, and Oldsmobile products were being repositioned in their new hierarchy as GM began to consolidate operations after William Durant had left. 

It was  replaced by the Model 43 and shared a platform with the Buick Model 10. The Oldsmobile Model R Curved Dash competed with the Chevrolet Series F while Chevrolet was still independent from GM, and in 1908 the Ford Model T was also introduced. It was also known as the "Baby Olds" as it was smaller than the mid-level Oldsmobile Autocrat Series 28 and the top level Oldsmobile Limited Series 23.

History
The Model 42 was equipped with a side-valve, in-line  four-cylinder engine developing 20 bhp. The engine was installed in the front, driving the rear wheels through a transmission shaft. The gearbox had three forward gears, with the gearshift lever positioned to the right of the driver.

As with other Oldsmobiles of the time, the brake pedal came into contact with the Drum brake on the rear wheels. The retail price of the Model 42 started at US$1,350 ($ in  dollars ) for a 5-passenger touring sedan.

See also
Cadillac Type 51
Chevrolet Series FA
Oldsmobile Light Eight
Buick Six
Oakland Four

References

Model 42
1910s cars

Brass Era vehicles